Ski jumping at the 2002 Winter Olympics, consisted of three events held from 10 February to 13 February, taking place at Park City.

Medal summary

Medal table

Switzerland topped the medal table, with two gold medals from Simon Amman. The bronze medal won by Slovenia in the team event was the country's first in the sport.

Events

Participating NOCs
Twenty-two nations participated in ski jumping at the Salt Lake Games. Estonia and Kyrgyzstan made their Olympic ski jumping debuts.

References

External links
Official Results Book – Ski jumping

 
2002 Winter Olympics events
2002
2002 in ski jumping
Ski jumping competitions in the United States